Dame Mary Latchford Jones, DBE (27 June 1877 – 2 April 1968) was a British Conservative politician and the first woman Lord Mayor of Manchester.

Life
Mary Latchford Kingsmill Jones was born in Dublin to Percival and Margaret Jones. She was educated at Alexandra College but did not go to university. In 1914, she moved to Manchester to join her brother, a doctor in the city. In 1921, she was elected to Manchester City Council, representing the Conservative Party having adopted her brothers name. Jones served on council committees, and represented the council on external bodies. At both the 1924 and 1929 United Kingdom general elections, she stood in Manchester Ardwick, taking second place each time.

In 1938, Jones became an alderman, and the same year was made an Officer of the Order of the British Empire. From 1947 to 1949, she served as Lord Mayor of Manchester, the first woman to hold the post. During her term Manchester United won the FA Cup and she welcomed the winning team back to the city. She also conferred the freedom of the city on Winston Churchill. At the end of her term, she was promoted to become a Commander of the Order of the British Empire (CBE). A painting paid for by fifty women's groups was commissioned. She retired from the council in 1966 and was made an honorary alderman the following year.

Death
She died at her home in Manchester on 2 April 1968, aged 90.

Honours
 Honorary Freeman of Manchester in 1956. 
 Dame Commander of the Order of the British Empire (DBE) in 1958.

References

1877 births
1968 deaths
Conservative Party (UK) councillors
Conservative Party (UK) parliamentary candidates
Mayors of Manchester
People educated at Alexandra College
People from Dublin (city)
Women mayors of places in England
Women councillors in England
Dames Commander of the Order of the British Empire